The 1928 World Table Tennis Championships men's doubles was the second edition of the men's doubles championship.
Alfred Liebster and Robert Thum defeated Charles Bull and Fred Perry in the final by three sets to nil.

Results

+ retired

See also
List of World Table Tennis Championships medalists

References

-